This is a list of electricity-generating power stations in the U.S. state of Wisconsin, sorted by type and name.  In 2019, Wisconsin had a total summer capacity of 15,312 MW through all of its power plants, and a net generation of 66,774 GWh.  The corresponding electrical energy generation mix in 2021 was 41.8% coal, 33.8% natural gas, 15.2% nuclear, 3.8% hydroelectric, 2.5% wind, 1.7% biomass (including refuse-derived fuel), solar (0.9%), and Petroleum (0.3%).

The Fox River powered the world's first commercial hydroelectric central power station, the Vulcan Street Plant, during 1882 to 1891.  An exact replica of the plant, designated as a National Historic Engineering Landmark, is located near the original site in Appleton.  Wisconsin also has the nation's oldest (since 1891) continuously operating hydroelectric facility in Whiting according to the U.S. Energy Information Administration.

During the first half of the 20th century, Wisconsin's utility companies pioneered efficiency improvements for coal-fired electricity generation at the former East Wells (Onieda) Street Power Plant, and former Port Washington Power Plant.  Nuclear power has generated Wisconsin's largest share of carbon-free electrical energy since 1970.  Natural gas generation has nearly quadrupled over the past decade to replace retiring facilities and satisfy rising demand.

Nuclear power stations

Retired facilities:
 Kewaunee Nuclear Generating Station - 556 MW: operated 1974-2013
 La Crosse Boiling Water Reactor - 50 MW: operated 1969-1987

Fossil-fuel power stations
Data from the U.S. Energy Information Administration serves as a general reference.

Coal-fired

Natural gas-fired

Petroleum-fired

Renewable power stations
Data from the U.S. Energy Information Administration serves as a general reference.
Renew Wisconsin maintains additional data on the state's renewable generation resources.

Biomass & Refuse

Hydroelectric

WE Energies operates 13 hydro facilities, totaling 89 MW.
Alliant Energy operates 2 hydro facilities, maxing out at 31 MW.

Wind

Solar

References

External links

http://www.eia.doe.gov/cneaf/electricity/st_profiles/wisconsin.pdf
https://web.archive.org/web/20101229213558/http://tonto.eia.doe.gov/state/state_energy_profiles.cfm?sid=WI

Wisconsin
 
Lists of buildings and structures in Wisconsin